In algebraic geometry, a branch of mathematics, an adequate equivalence relation is an equivalence relation on algebraic cycles of smooth projective varieties used to obtain a well-working theory of such cycles, and in particular, well-defined intersection products. Pierre Samuel formalized the concept of an adequate equivalence relation in 1958. Since then it has become central to theory of motives. For every adequate equivalence relation, one may define the category of pure motives with respect to that relation.

Possible (and useful) adequate equivalence relations include rational, algebraic, homological and numerical equivalence. They are called "adequate" because dividing out by the equivalence relation is functorial, i.e. push-forward (with change of codimension) and pull-back of cycles is well-defined. Codimension 1 cycles modulo rational equivalence form the classical group of divisors modulo linear equivalence. All cycles modulo rational equivalence form the Chow ring.

Definition 
Let Z*(X) := Z[X] be the free abelian group on the algebraic cycles of X. Then an adequate equivalence relation is a family of equivalence relations, ∼X on Z*(X), one for each smooth projective variety X, satisfying the following three conditions:
 (Linearity) The equivalence relation is compatible with addition of cycles.
 (Moving lemma) If  are cycles on X, then there exists a cycle  such that  ~X  and  intersects  properly.
 (Push-forwards) Let  and  be cycles such that  intersects  properly. If  ~X 0, then  ~Y 0, where  is the projection.

The push-forward cycle in the last axiom is often denoted

If  is the graph of a function, then this reduces to the push-forward of the function. The generalizations of functions from X to Y to cycles on X × Y are known as correspondences. The last axiom allows us to push forward cycles by a correspondence.

Examples of equivalence relations 

The most common equivalence relations, listed from strongest to weakest, are gathered in the following table.

Notes

References
 
 

Algebraic geometry
Equivalence (mathematics)